Bruce Charles "Bill" Mollison (4 May 1928 – 24 September 2016) was an Australian researcher, author, scientist, teacher and biologist. In 1981, he was awarded the Right Livelihood Award  "for developing and promoting the theory and practice of permaculture".

Permaculture (from "permanent agriculture") is an integrated system of ecological and environmental design which Mollison co-developed with David Holmgren, and which they together envisioned as a perennial and sustainable form of agriculture. In 1974, Mollison began his collaboration with Holmgren, and in 1978 they published their book Permaculture One, which introduced this design system to the general public.

Mollison founded The Permaculture Institute in Tasmania, and created the education system to train others under the umbrella of permaculture. This education system of "train the trainer", utilized through a formal Permaculture Design Course and Certification (PDC), has taught hundreds of thousands of people throughout the world how to grow food and be sustainable using permaculture design principles.

Life and work

Biography
Bruce Charles "Bill" Mollison was born in 1928, in the Bass Strait fishing village of  Stanley located on the north-west part of Tasmania, Australia. He moved from Tasmania to Tyalgum in the Tweed Valley of northern New South Wales in 1987 where he lived for the next decade before returning to Tasmania. He spent his final years in Sisters Beach in north-west Tasmania. He died in Hobart, Tasmania, in 2016, aged 88. He is survived by his fifth wife Lisa, four daughters, and two sons.

Career
Mollison left school at age 15 to help run the family bakery. In the following ten years he worked as a shark fisherman, seaman, forester, mill worker, trapper, snarer, tractor-driver and naturalist.

In 1954, at the age of 26, Mollison joined and worked for the 'Wildlife Survey Section' of the Commonwealth Scientific and Industrial Research Organisation (CSIRO). In the 1960s, he worked as a curator at the Tasmanian Museum. He also worked with the Inland Fisheries Commission, where he was able to resume his field work. In 1966, he entered the University of Tasmania. After he received his degree in bio-geography, he stayed on to lecture and teach, and developed the unit of Environmental Psychology. He retired from teaching in 1979.

Development of permaculture
Mollison's work with the CSIRO laid the foundation for his life-long passion: Permaculture. Mollison told his student Toby Hemenway that the original idea for permaculture came to him in 1959 while he was observing marsupials browsing in the Tasmanian rain forests, because he was "inspired and awed by the life-giving abundance and rich interconnectedness of this eco-system." At that moment, Mollison jotted down the following words in his diary: "I believe that we could build systems that would function as well as this one does." By the late 1960s, he started developing ideas about stable agricultural systems on the southern Australian island state of Tasmania. This resulted from his own personal observations of the growth and use of the industrial-agricultural methods that he believed had rapidly degraded the soil of his native state. In his view, these same methods posed a danger because they were highly dependent on non-renewable resources, and were additionally poisoning land and water, reducing biodiversity, and removing billions of tons of topsoil from previously fertile landscapes. Writes Mollison:

In 1974–75, he and David Holmgren "jointly evolved a framework for a sustainable agricultural system based on a multi-crop of perennial trees, shrubs, herbs (vegetables and weeds), fungi, and root systems" for which they coined the word "permaculture".   Holmgren was a student at the radical Environmental Design School in the Tasmanian College of Environmental Education.  Mollison was a senior tutor in the Psychology Dept of the University of Tasmania."

Originally intended as a contraction of permanent agriculture, Mollison quickly realised it was a system for permanent culture, as without a productive landscape, a healthy ecology and a circular economy, no culture would survive. Permaculture began as both a positive concept – open to new information – and a practice that could integrate the knowledge about sustainable, ecological techniques from all parts of the world.

Soon after permaculture was first introduced and then put into practice by the public, Mollison recognized that permaculture principles encompassed a movement that included not only agriculture, horticulture, architecture, and ecology, but also economic systems, land access strategies, and legal systems for businesses and communities:

He helped found the first Permaculture Institute, established in 1979 to "teach the practical design of sustainable soil, water, plant, and legal and economic systems to students worldwide." He taught a three-week course at The Tree People in Los Angeles in 1981. In 1981, the first graduates of the permaculture design course (PDC) that he had helped to initiate, started to design permaculture systems in their respective communities. In this way, the philosophy of permaculture had begun to move beyond its original context in "land management" to cover most, if not all, aspects of human life.

In 1987, Mollison taught the first PDC course that was offered in India. By 2011 there had been over 300,000 such graduates practicing and teaching throughout the world.

He has been called the founder and "father" of permaculture.

Films
In the late 1980s and early 1990s, Mollison appeared in several video productions that helped popularize permaculture concepts.

 Permaculture: 50-minute Australian-made documentary from 1989 - see also Timestamped study notes for this video.
 In Grave Danger of Falling Food: Another 50-minute Australian-made documentary from 1989
  The Global Gardener (1991)
 Part 1 The Tropics
 Part 2 Drylands
 Part 3 Cool Climates
 Part 4 Urban Settings

Selected bibliography
 Permaculture One: A Perennial Agriculture for Human Settlements, with David Holmgren. (Melbourne, Australia: Transworld Publishers, 1978) 
 Permaculture Two: Practical Design for Town and Country in Permanent Agriculture (Tasmania, Australia: Tagari Publications, 1979) 
 Permaculture – A Designer's Manual (1988) : has been used extensively as the text book and curriculum for the 72-hour Certificate course in Permaculture Design.
 Introduction to Permaculture, with Reny Mia Slay. (Tasmania, Australia: Tagari Publications, 1991; revised 1997; 2nd ed. 2011) : in this book recognized that his original idea for permaculture had evolved, and a movement had grown, that could "spread to cover all human habitats; and the word was redefined as not just permanent agriculture, but also permanent culture."
 The Permaculture Book of Ferment and Human Nutrition (1993, Revised 2011) 
 Travels in Dreams: An Autobiography (1996) 

Articles

See also
 Peter Andrews
 David Holmgren
 Albert Bates
 Masanobu Fukuoka
 Sepp Holzer
 Albert Howard
 Brad Lancaster
 Geoff Lawton
 G. Nammalvar
 P. A. Yeomans
 Toby Hemenway

Notes

References

External links

 Bill Mollison Permaculture Lecture Series, On-Line - over 70 hours of video; two design courses taught by Mollison at the Fossil Rim Wildlife Center in Glen Rose Texas in 1994 and 1995

Interviews
 Seeds of Change interview 2001 
 Plowboy Interview
 In Context interview
 Permaculture: A Quiet Revolution – An interview with Bill Mollison by Scott London

 
 – where he attended the International Permaculture Conference in Motovun, Croatia

1928 births
2016 deaths
Australian gardeners
Australian psychologists
Environmental psychologists
Organic gardeners
Sustainability advocates
People involved with desert greening
Permaculturalists
Writers from Tasmania
People from Stanley, Tasmania
Australian biologists